Matthew Montgomery (born November 16, 1975), also known as Piggy D., is an American musician most famous as a guitarist in horror punk band Wednesday 13 and bassist for Rob Zombie.

Career history

He first took over bass duties with Rob Zombie from current Ozzy Osbourne bassist Blasko, playing "American Witch" live on the Late Show with David Letterman right before picking up the second leg of the Educated Horses tour in mid 2006. To this day, he maintains a successful solo career while playing with Zombie.

Mr. Piggy co-directed a short 10-minute promo video entitled Along Came a Spider: the Movie for Alice Cooper's album which was released on the Cooper's official YouTube-page on October 2, 2008. The movie featured three songs from the album: "Vengeance is Mine," "(In Touch with Your) Feminine Side", and "Killed by Love." The video stars Alice Cooper, Slash, Roxxi Dott, Howie Pyro, and Dave Pino. Piggy D. also contributed all the graphic design for the album including the album cover and multiple teaser posters. Piggy D has also contributed album artwork for John 5's solo albums.  His work features on Remixploitation (2009), Requiem (2008) and The Devil Knows My Name (2007). Piggy D also co-designed the art for the newest Lita Ford album Wicked Wonderland.

In 2009, Piggy co-wrote and produced the first ever Alice Cooper Halloween song, "Keepin' Halloween Alive." The single was released digitally on iTunes, and a limited edition CD. A glow in the dark 7" record has also been released.

February 2010 saw the release of the first studio album with Zombie that featured Piggy. The song "The Man Who Laughs" was co-written by Piggy.

In 2011, Piggy co-wrote with David Spreng, Bob Ezrin and Alice Cooper for the long waited sequel Welcome 2 My Nightmare. The track "Last Man On Earth" is featured on the album.

Piggy and vocalist Shannon Gallant began working together again after a 5-year hiatus, and began work a new recording project called The Haxans. The duo have release two singles "Cold Blood" and "Black Cat Bone."

In 2011, Piggy was invited to co-write and co-produce the debut album for The Doom Party. A release date has not been set.

In 2013, Piggy contributed to the song writing for the new Rob Zombie album Venomous Rat Regeneration Vendor with the song "Lucifer Rising". Piggy uses ESP basses.

In 2016, Piggy announced that he was collaborating with Ash Costello from New Years Day on a new project called The Haxans. The first single "Chains" was released on June 6, 2016.

Discography

With Wednesday 13
2005: Transylvania 90210: Songs of Death, Dying, and the Dead

With John 5
2007: The Devil Knows My Name

With Rob Zombie
2007: Zombie Live
2008: Punisher: War Zone Soundtrack
2010: Hellbilly Deluxe 2: Noble Jackals, Penny Dreadfuls and the Systematic Dehumanization of Cool
2013: Venomous Rat Regeneration Vendor
2015: Spookshow International Live
2016: The Electric Warlock Acid Witch Satanic Orgy Celebration Dispenser
2021: The Lunar Injection Kool Aid Eclipse Conspiracy

With Alice Cooper
2009: "Keepin' Halloween Alive" - Single
2011 "Last Man On Earth" album track Co-songwriter for "Welcome 2 My Nightmare"

Solo
2007: The Evacuation Plan
2010: Can't Blame You  - Single
2011: God Save The Queen Bee - Single
2011:  Locust Dance - Single
2011: 1975 - Single
2012: Repeat Offender - The Singles and Remix Collection

The Haxans
2012: Cold Blood - Single
2012: Black Cat Bone - Single
2016: Chains - Single
2017: Three Hits from Hell - EP
2017: Lights Out - Single
2017: Party Monsters (To Be Released October 13, 2017)

The Doom Party
2013 "The Last Party" - Single (co-writer/co-producer)

References

Living people
American male singer-songwriters
American heavy metal bass guitarists
American male bass guitarists
American rock songwriters
American rock singers
Musicians from New Orleans
Horror punk musicians
White Zombie (band) members
1975 births
Musicians from Houston
Guitarists from Louisiana
Guitarists from Texas
Amen (American band) members
21st-century American singers
21st-century American bass guitarists
Singer-songwriters from Texas
Singer-songwriters from Louisiana